Konami 80's AC Special (known in Japan as  is a compilation of arcade video games, originally released in arcades in 1998. It was later ported to the PlayStation in 1999, where it was renamed to Konami Arcade Classics for its North American release. Unlike most of Konami's PlayStation games, the PlayStation version was not released in PAL regions.

While many compilations on home consoles predate Konami Arcade Classics, it is one of the earliest examples of an arcade reissue of classic games, being preceded only by the Namco Classics Collection series. It is also, to date, one of only two arcade compilations with both a coin-op and consumer release (the other being Space Invaders Anniversary, which was only released in Japan and Europe).

Development
The collection was developed for the System 573 arcade system - hardware based on the Sony PlayStation architecture. This made the collection easy to convert to the PlayStation home console. A look into the software's readme files reveals notes that the original ROM data was used to obtain assets for the reprogrammed games.

While the arcade version had an intro movie and also had an attract mode for certain games, the PlayStation version got its own unique intro movie. In addition, the North American PlayStation version got a small history feature, which gave brief blurbs of facts about each of the included games.

Included games
Pooyan (1982)
Scramble (1981)
Yie Ar Kung-Fu (1984)
Roc'n Rope (1983)
Shao-lin's Road (originally released in North America as Kicker; 1985)
Circus Charlie (1984)
Super Cobra (1981)
Road Fighter (1984)
Time Pilot (1982)
Gyruss (1983)

Reception
Chris Charla reviewed the PlayStation version of the game for Next Generation, rating it three stars out of five, and stated that "They were fun then, they're fun now, and with 10 games included, this package is an excellent deal."

Reviews
The Video Game Critic (Dec 09, 1999)
GameSpot (Dec 20, 1999)
IGN (Jan 07, 2000)

See also
Konami Collector's Series: Arcade Advanced
Konami Classics Series: Arcade Hits
 Konami Antiques MSX Collection
 Konami Classics for Xbox 360
List of Konami games

References

External links
Konami 80's Arcade Gallery at Arcade Museum

1998 video games
Konami video game compilations
Arcade video games
PlayStation (console) games
Video games developed in Japan